In the U.S. state of Illinois, U.S. Route 36 (US 36) is an east–west highway that runs across the central portion of the state. It runs east from Missouri over the Mark Twain Memorial Bridge over the Mississippi River with Interstate 72. The eastern terminus of U.S. 36 in Illinois is located near the unincorporated area of Raven near the Illinois-Indiana state line.

Route description

U.S. 36 parallels the old Wabash Railroad from the Mississippi River at Hannibal, MO east to Decatur, IL.  Norfolk Southern Railway operates on this route today.

U.S. 36 is overlapped with Interstate 72 for more than half its routing in Illinois, . At Decatur, I-72 separates from it and travels around the city to the north, while US 36 enters the city and passes through downtown on the four-lane Eldorado Street.  Just beyond 19th Street, US 36 turns to the southeast on a four-lane divided alignment paralleling a railroad, exiting Decatur on the southeast side.  The road crosses Lake Decatur and narrows to two lanes before turning due east.  After turning east, U.S. 36 runs largely in a straight line, mostly through open country, until it exits the state.

History

Initially, US 36 followed part of IL 106, IL 36, IL 3, IL 10, and IL 121 (which is newly built back then). A couple of portions were under construction. In 1935, these state routes were either truncated or removed due to confusion (like IL 36) and redundancy. In 1936, US 36 moved from the Wabash Bridge (now used by railroad) to the old Mark Twain Memorial Bridge.

From 1942 to 1971, US 54 ran concurrently with US 36 from New Hartford to Chicago via US 36 and several other routes.

Until around 1977, no significant changes to US 36 were made. Then, Interstate 72 (and another part of the freeway that would later become I-72) extended from Monticello to Jacksonville. As a result, US 36 moved to a part of I-72 from Decatur to Jacksonville. By 1979, the freeway then extended west near Riggston. By 1988, it extended west to IL 100. At this point, the Valley City Eagle Bridges were completed. However, by 1992, the twin spans, as well as the freeway west to IL 336, opened. By 1996, the Interstate 72 designation extends west using the new US 36 freeway and ends abruptly as soon as US 36 leaves the freeway. Also, Interstate 172 acquired the whole of the IL 336 
freeway portion. In 2000, I-72 extended west to connect to Hannibal, Missouri, after a new Mark Twain Memorial Bridge opened. As a result, US 36 moved northward to get onto the new bridge. After that, the old bridge was demolished.

Major intersections

References

External links

 Illinois
36
Transportation in Pike County, Illinois
Transportation in Scott County, Illinois
Transportation in Morgan County, Illinois
Transportation in Sangamon County, Illinois
Transportation in Macon County, Illinois
Transportation in Piatt County, Illinois
Transportation in Douglas County, Illinois
Transportation in Edgar County, Illinois